Julio Avelino Comesaña López (born 10 March 1948) is a Uruguayan professional football manager and former football player.

Playing career

Club

Comesaña played for 7 clubs during his career as a footballer: Racing Montevideo (1967–1968) in Uruguay; Gimnasia y Esgrima La Plata (1969–1970), Kimberley (1971), and Ferro Carril Oeste (1974) in Argentina; Millonarios (1972–1973), Atlético Junior (1973, and 1975–1979), and Independiente Medellín (1980–1981) in Colombia.

Coaching career

Club

As a manager, Comesaña has coached 16 teams: Independiente Medellín (1982–1986, 1992, 2000 and 2021–2022), Deportivo Cali (1987 and 2012), Atlético Junior (1991, 1992–1994, 1997, 2002, 2008–2009, 2014, 2017, 2018, 2019–2020 and 2022), Independiente Santa Fe (1995–1996 and 2003–2004), Deportes Tolima (1996), Real Cartagena (2006), Deportivo Pereira (2011), and Patriotas (2013–2014) in Colombia; Guaraní (1988) in Paraguay; Danubio (1989–1990), Sud América (2015–2016), Racing Montevideo (2016), and River Plate Montevideo (2016) in Uruguay; Unión Española (1996) in Chile; Deportivo Cuenca (2005) in Ecuador; Colón de Santa Fe (2019) in Argentina.

Honours

Player 

 Millonarios
 Categoría Primera A: 1972
 Atlético Junior
 Categoría Primera A: 1977

Manager 

 Atlético Junior
 Categoría Primera A: 1993, 2018-II, 2019-I
 Copa Colombia: 2017

References

External links
 
 

1948 births
Living people
Uruguayan footballers
Uruguayan expatriate footballers
Uruguayan football managers
Peñarol players
Racing Club de Montevideo players
Club de Gimnasia y Esgrima La Plata footballers
Ferro Carril Oeste footballers
Independiente Medellín footballers
Atlético Junior footballers
Millonarios F.C. players
Categoría Primera A players
Club Guaraní managers
Danubio F.C. managers
Unión Española managers
Deportivo Cali managers
Atlético Junior managers
C.D. Cuenca managers
Independiente Medellín managers
Independiente Santa Fe managers
Expatriate footballers in Argentina
Expatriate footballers in Colombia
Expatriate football managers in Chile
Expatriate football managers in Colombia
Expatriate football managers in Ecuador
Expatriate football managers in Paraguay
Deportivo Pereira managers
Association football midfielders
River Plate Montevideo managers
Deportes Tolima managers
Patriotas Boyacá managers